Stephanie Horner (born March 19, 1989) is a competition swimmer from Canada. She is a butterfly and freestyle specialist.

Career
After having won four medals at the 2007 Pan American Games, Horner competed for her native country at the 2008 Summer Olympics in Beijing, China, and at the 2012 Summer Olympics in London.  Horner also made the 2011 Canadian World Championships team, qualifying in the 400-metre individual medley event at the 14th FINA World Championships in Shanghai, China.

In 2016, she was officially named to Canada's Olympic team for the 2016 Summer Olympics in the open water swim event.

In April 2017, Horner was named to Canada's 2017 World Aquatics Championships team in Budapest, Hungary.

Honours
In 2012 Horner was awarded the Queen Elizabeth II Diamond Jubilee Medal.

References

External links
 
 
 
 
 
 

1989 births
Living people
Female long-distance swimmers
Auburn Tigers women's swimmers
Canadian female freestyle swimmers
Canadian female butterfly swimmers
Olympic swimmers of Canada
People from Bathurst, New Brunswick
Sportspeople from New Brunswick
Swimmers at the 2007 Pan American Games
Swimmers at the 2008 Summer Olympics
Swimmers at the 2012 Summer Olympics
Pan American Games silver medalists for Canada
Pan American Games bronze medalists for Canada
Swimmers at the 2016 Summer Olympics
Pan American Games medalists in swimming
Medalists at the 2007 Pan American Games
21st-century Canadian women